Asterorhombus is a genus of lefteye flounders native to the Indo-Pacific. These small flatfishes only reach  in length.

Species
There are currently three recognized species in this genus:
 Asterorhombus cocosensis (Bleeker, 1855) (Cocos Island flounder)
 Asterorhombus filifer Hensley & J. E. Randall, 2003
 Asterorhombus intermedius (Bleeker, 1865) (Intermediate flounder)

References

Bothidae
Marine fish genera
Taxa named by Shigeho Tanaka